Cornell Holloway (born January 30, 1966) is a former American football defensive back. He played for the Indianapolis Colts from 1990 to 1992.

References

1966 births
Living people
American football defensive backs
Pittsburgh Panthers football players
Indianapolis Colts players